Hon. John Damer (25 June 1744 – 15 August 1776) was a British Whig politician.

Family
John was the first of three sons of Joseph Damer, 1st Earl of Dorchester by the Lady Caroline Sackville.  His mother was the daughter of Lionel Cranfield Sackville, 1st Duke of Dorset and his wife Elizabeth Colyear.  His maternal grandmother was the daughter of Lieutenant-General Walter Philip Colyear, and the niece of David Colyear, 1st Earl of Portmore. His younger brothers were the Hon. Lionel Damer and the George Damer, 2nd Earl of Dorchester.

Education
Damer was educated at Eton (1755–61) and Trinity College, Cambridge (1762).

Marriage

He married the future sculptor Anne Seymour Conway, daughter of Field Marshal Rt. Hon. Henry Seymour Conway and Lady Caroline Campbell, on 14 June 1767. She separated from him seven years later.

Political career
Damer was the Member of Parliament for Gatton (1768–1774).

Death
Damer got heavily into debt and his father refused to help him financially. He shot himself on 15 August 1776 at the Bedford Arms, Covent Garden.

Legacy
Damer is mentioned in the lyrics of the traditional Irish song "Limerick Rake".

References

1744 births
People educated at Eton College
Whig (British political party) MPs
1776 deaths
Alumni of Trinity College, Cambridge
Members of the Parliament of Great Britain for English constituencies
British MPs 1768–1774
Heirs apparent who never acceded
Dawson-Damer family
Suicides by firearm in England